The multimachine is an all-purpose open source machine tool that can be built inexpensively by a semi-skilled mechanic with common hand tools, from discarded car and truck parts, using only commonly available hand tools and no electricity. Its size can range from being small enough to fit in a closet to one hundred times that size. The multimachine can accurately perform all the functions of an entire machine shop by itself.

The multimachine was first developed as a personal project by Pat Delaney, then grew into an open source project organized via a Yahoo! group. The 2,600 member support group that has grown up around its creation is made up of engineers, machinists, and experimenters who have proven that the machine works. As an open-source machine tool that can be built cheaply on-site, the Multimachine could have many uses in developing countries. The multimachine group is currently focused on the humanitarian aspects of the multimachine, and on promulgating the concept of the multimachine as a means to create jobs and economic growth in developing countries.

The multimachine first became known to a wider audience as the result of the 2006 Open Source Gift Guide article on the Make magazine website, in which the multimachine was mentioned under the caption "Multimachine - Open Source machine tool".

Uses
As a general-purpose machine tool that includes the functions of a milling machine, drill press, and lathe, the multimachine can be used for many projects important for humanitarian and economic development in developing countries:

 Agriculture: Building and repairing irrigation pumps and farm implements
 Water supplies: Making and repairing water pumps and water-well drilling rigs.
 Food supplies: Building steel-rolling-and-bending machines for making fuel efficient cook stoves and other cooking equipment
 Transportation: Anything from making cart axles to rebuilding vehicle clutch, brake, and other parts.
 Education: Building simple pipe-and-bar-bending machines to make school furniture, providing "hands on" training on student-built multimachines that they take with them when they leave school.
 Job creation: A group of specialized but easily built multimachines can be combined to form a small, very low cost, metal working factory which could also serve as a trade school. Students could be taught a single skill on a specialized machine and be paid as a worker while learning other skills that they could take elsewhere.

Accuracy 
The design goals of the multimachine were to create an easily  built machine tool, made from "junk," that is nonetheless all-purpose and accurate enough for production work. It has been reported to be able to make cuts within a tenth (one ten-thousandth of an inch), which means that in at least some setups it can equal commercial machine tool accuracy.

In almost every kind of machining operation, either the work piece or the cutting tool turns. If enough flexibility is built into the parts of a machine tool involved in these functions, the resulting machine can do almost every kind of machining operation that will physically fit on it. The multimachine starts with the concept of 3-in-1 machine tools—basically a combination of metal lathe, mill and drill press—but adds many other functions. It can be a 10-in-1 (or even more) machine tool.

Construction 
At a high-level, the multimachine is built using vehicle engine blocks combined in a LEGO-like fashion. It utilizes the cylinder bores and engine deck to provide accurate surfaces.  Since cylinder bores are bored exactly parallel to each other and at exact right angles to the cylinder head surface, multimachine accuracy begins at the factory where the engine block was built. In the most common version of the multimachine, one that has a roller bearing spindle, this precision is maintained during construction with simple cylinder re-boring of the #3 cylinder to the size of the roller bearing outside diameter (OD) and re-boring the #1 cylinder to fit the overarm OD. These cylinder-boring operations can be done in almost any engine shop and at low cost. An engine machine shop provides the most inexpensive and accurate machine work commonly done anywhere and guarantees that the spindle and overarm will be perfectly aligned and at an exact right angle to the face (head surface) of the main engine block that serves as the base of the machine. Use a piece of pipe made to fit the inner diameter of the bearings as the spindle. A three-bearing spindle is used because the "main" spindle bearings just "float" in the cylinder bore so that the third bearing is needed to "locate" the spindle, act as a thrust bearing, and support the heavy pulley. The multimachine uses a unique way of clamping the engine blocks together that is easily built, easily adjusted, and very accurate. The multimachine makes use of a concrete and steel construction technique that was heavily used in industry during the First World War and resurrected for this project.

References

External links 
Open source machine website

Machine tools
Open-source hardware